These are the 1975 Five Nations Championship squads:

England

Head coach: John Burgess

 Bill Beaumont
 Neil Bennett
 Mike Burton
 Martin Cooper
 Fran Cotton (c.)
 Peter Dixon
 David Duckham
 Nigel Horton
 Tony Jorden
 Alan Morley
 Tony Neary
 Alan Old
 Jacko Page
 Peter Preece
 John Pullin
 Chris Ralston
 Andy Ripley
 Dave Rollitt
 Peter Rossborough
 Keith Smith
 Steve Smith
 Peter Squires
 Stack Stevens
 Roger Uttley
 Peter Warfield
 John Watkins
 Jan Webster

France

Head coach: Jean Desclaux

 Richard Astre
 Jean-Luc Averous
 Jean-Louis Azarete
 Jean-Pierre Bastiat
 Roland Bertranne
 Victor Boffelli
 Jack Cantoni
 Gérard Cholley
 Claude Dourthe (c.)**
 Alain Esteve
 Jean-Martin Etchenique
 Jacques Fouroux (c.)*
 Jean-François Gourdon
 Alain Guilbert
 Jean-Pierre Lux
 Alain Paco
 Lucien Paries
 Jean-Pierre Rives
 Jean-Pierre Romeu
 Olivier Saisset
 François Sangalli
 Georges Senal
 Claude Spanghero
 Jean-Claude Skrela
 Michel Taffary
 Jean-Louis Ugartemendia
 Armand Vaquerin

 captain in the first game

Ireland

Head coach: Roly Meates

 Roger Clegg
 Seamus Dennison
 Willie Duggan
 Anthony Ensor
 Mike Gibson
 Tom Grace
 Moss Keane
 Ken Kennedy
 Willie John McBride (c.)
 Billy McCombe
 Stewart McKinney
 Roy McLoughlin
 Arthur McMaster
 Dick Milliken
 John Moloney
 Michael Sherry
 Fergus Slattery
 Pa Whelan

Scotland

Head coach: Bill Dickinson

 Ian Barnes
 David Bell
 Mike Biggar
 Gordon Brown
 Sandy Carmichael
 Lewis Dick
 Andy Irvine
 Wilson Lauder
 David Leslie
 Nairn MacEwan
 Duncan Madsen
 Alastair McHarg
 Ian McGeechan
 Ian McLauchlan (c.)
 Doug Morgan
 Jim Renwick
 Billy Steele

Wales

Head coach: John Dawes

 Phil Bennett
 John Bevan
 Roger Blyth
 Terry Cobner
 Gerald Davies
 Mervyn Davies (c.)
 Gareth Edwards
 Trefor Evans
 Charlie Faulkner
 Steve Fenwick
 Ray Gravell
 Allan Martin
 Graham Price
 Mike Roberts
 Derek Quinnell
 Geoff Wheel
 J.J. Williams
 J.P.R. Williams
 Bobby Windsor

External links
1975 Five Nations Championship at ESPN

Six Nations Championship squads